The flora of the U.S. Sierra Nevada alpine zone is characterized by small, low growing, cushion and mat forming plants that can survive the harsh conditions in the high-altitude alpine zone above the timber line. These flora often occur in alpine fell-fields. The Sierra Nevada alpine zone lacks a dominant plant species that characterizes it, so may or may not be called a vegetation type. But it is found above the subalpine forest, which is the highest in a succession of recognized vegetation types at increasing elevations.

Botanists have ranked the Sierra Nevada alpine zone floral bloom as one of California's foremost wildflower displays, with flowers of fantastic color and abundance. Many of the alpine species are notable for large and showy flowers, which must compete for the pollinators during brief growing seasons. Botanist Philip A. Munz wrote, "These natural rock gardens are spectacular sights when in full flower." Botanist Laird R. Blackwell wrote, "Up here... the flowers seem to glow... perhaps only the flowers of the harsh desert can rival the alpine flowers for intensity."

Over 90% of California's alpine flora are perennial herbs. Annuals are not common. Depending on the elevation used to define its lower boundary, the Sierra Nevada alpine zone may have almost 600 species, about 200 of which are only found here (endemic). The flora includes plants that are descended from the plants that survived the glaciation of the last ice age (relict plants), because they were growing on mountain peaks that stood above the ice sheets like islands.

Environmental conditions influencing flora

The plants are influenced by having to endure long and very cold winters, poor to no soils, constant high winds, intense sunlight, and a short cool and dry growing season in the summer, that lasts only about 6–8 weeks.

Winds are strong and constant. The constant wind makes unsheltered areas colder than sheltered spots, depositing snow in some places, while scouring the snow out of other locations. The constant wind increases loss of water from the plants to the atmosphere (transpiration). Sunlight is intense. Soils are thin and rocky, or absent. Soils are low in moisture. Rainfall is rare. Annual plants must quickly grow to maturity, and all plants must quickly flower and develop mature seed.

Characteristic growth patterns and physiology

Above the tree line, extreme winds preclude tree-like growth. Constant winds hitting the plants limits their size and flattens their shape. Small size or dwarfism is therefore an adaptive feature to the extremes, and most alpine plants are just a few inches tall. One botanist wrote, "Plants adapt by scrunching down close to the ground where botanists have to crawl around on their bellies with hand lenses to fully appreciate the diversity of life... Plants are mere centimeters tall, forming a mat so dense that it's hard to pick out separate species"., Another noted, "a world of miniature plants only a few inches high... leaves huddle near the ground or contour it with mats or cushions. Typically, the leaves of these plants are waxy or densely hairy - anything to protect them from the wind and intense solar radiation".

Alpine plants have many adaptations to aridity and intense sunlight in common with desert plants. Alpine plants often have gray appearance from hairs covering the leaves, which reflect the intense sunlight, and protect from winds that cause high rates of water loss through transpiration. Many Sierra Nevada alpine plants have reddish or whitish leaves to protect them from damage from intense ultraviolet radiation in the alpine zone. Fleshy roots and underground organs store food in the form of starches and sugars, allowing the plant to quickly grow when snow melts. Many plants form flower buds during the summer before the summer that they open, allowing a quick bloom for the short growing season.

Optimal temperatures for physiological processes may be lower than for lower elevation plants, and optimal light intensity for photosynthesis may be higher. Laboratory experiments showed the sierra Nevada alpine flora exhibited characteristic physiological responses. In the laboratory, there was strong dormancy control by short photoperiod, compared to lower elevation populations which had dormancy induced by either short or long photoperiods.

Evolutionary history and affinities
The flora has developed relatively recently, on its own, from western American sources. During the glaciation of the last ice age, some peaks stood out above the ice sheet (nunataks), and thus have a high diversity of pre-ice age alpine plants (relicts), an example being the Dana Plateau at Tioga Pass. Half of all the alpine plants found in the Sierra Nevada can be found on the Dana Plateau.

Many species also occur in, or have close relatives in, the Cascade Range and Rocky Mountains, e.g., the Penstemons (Penstemon spp., and Polemoniums (Polemoneaceae spp.).

A small group of Sierra Nevada alpine plants can found around the world in northern latitudes, which is called (circumboreal),. An example is bush cinquefoil (Potentilla fruticosa), which ranges throughout arctic regions of Alaska, Labrador, and the high mountains of Eurasia.

Diversity and taxa

Broad-leaved, erect perennials constitute about 50% of the species, with perennial graminoid (grasses or grass-like plants) species next at about 21%, and plants growing as mats or cushions at about 11%. Annuals plus woody shrubs total only about 6% of the flora.

There are over 500 floral species above , and almost 400 above .

Six plant families encompass more than 50% of the alpine zone species. The sunflower family (Asteraceae) is represented by about 55 species, there are almost 40 species from the grass family (Poaceae), the mustard family (Brassicaceae) has 34 species, and sedges (Cyperaceae) have over 30 species represented.

The largest genus is Carex, the "true sedge", with about 50 species above , followed by Draba in the mustard family, then Lupinus in the legume family (Fabaceae) with about 10 species.

Almost 70 species (about 17% of the flora) can be found in both subalpine and alpine habitats. Over 25% range from the alpine zone all the way to foothill habitats below . Nine species are only found in the alpine zone (obligate) above .

In a transectional study running from the desert near Bishop, California (elevation ), to Piute Pass (elevation ), perennials dominated, but also present were several annual species. Annuals are also rare in other alpine floras, including arctic.

Transpiration rates are of importance in determining local distribution patterns of flora of the Sierra Nevada alpine zone.

Annuals

Annuals plus woody shrubs constitute only about 6% of the number of Sierra Nevada alpine floral species.

Sierra gentian (Gentianopsis holopetala), in the gentian family (Gentianaceae), is an erect or sprawling annual or perennial, growing in wet meadows from  elevation.

Toothed owl's clover (Orthocarpus cuspidatus) is not a true clover, but is in the broomrape family (Orobanche).

Low growing pussypaws (Cistanthe umbellata), in the purslane family (Portulacaceae), usually grows in damp, partially shaded areas, and can be found up to as high as  elevation. It grows in a basal rosette, radiating leaf bearing and flower-head bearing stems that hug the ground. When the ground warms, the stems lying on the ground rise, to a steep angle, lifting the flower heads.

Perennials
Characteristic perennials are low growing, small, and may be erect or form mats or cushions.  Broad-leaved, erect perennials constitute 50% of the diversity of Sierra Nevada alpine species, with mats and cushions 11%.

The low-growing head of flowers of red sierra onion (Allium obtusum) appears to sit on the ground.

In the carrot family (Apiaceae), Clemen's mountain parsley (Oreonana clementis) forms a dense mat of tiny plants with tiny leave that might cover several square yards the area like a blanket.

Flat-topped pussytoes (Antennaria corymbosa) is a small (to ), mat-forming perennial herb, spreading via a tangled network of stolons. In the same genus are rosy pussytoes (A. rosea) and the mat forming Alpine Everlasting (A. media). Alpine aster (Aster alpigenus) stems may be lying on the ground (decumbent) or erect, and can be found up to  elevations. Dusty maidens (Chaenactis douglasii var. alpina), also called pincushion plant, is a sunflower family plant with cobwebby stems, and leaves and stems like a miniaturized version of its cousin, dusty maidens (var. douglasii).

 
Alpine fleabanes, or daisies, are sunflower family members. They include dwarf mountain fleabane, or cut-leaf daisy (Erigeron compositus), typifies the dwarfed growth pattern of the alpine zone, with disproportionately large flower heads compared to body size (1/4 to 1/2 the height of the flower stem). It grows as a mat or cushion on rocky slopes, talus, and rock ledges, to  elevation. It provides some of the most vivid color in the alpine zone, with flowers sometimes blooming in such profusion that they cover the leaves and rocky sloes and flats below.

Prickly hawkweed (Hieracium horridum) is hairy and grows in rocky places and crevices. It is unusually "tall" for an alpine zone plant, with stems reaching .

Anderson's mountain crown (Oreostemma alpigenum) is another sunflower family erect perennial, found below . It is less well adapted to harsh alpine conditions than some other alpine zone plants, having relatively (to ) large leaves that are mostly hairless, and correspondingly is found growing in more protected sites, such as grassy meadows. Argenta" means "silvery', in reference to the leaves. Northern goldenrod (Solidago multiradiata) grows to  elevation, and has narrow leaves. Stemless goldenweed (Stenotus acaulis) is mat-forming.

 
Lemmon's draba, (Draba lemmonii), is hairy and mat forming, and covered in clusters of lemon yellow flowers that may look like patches of lichens from a distance, since it grows in rock crevices and rock ledges. Its leaves are hairy, but are greener than the typical gray wooly leaves of many alpine plants.

Pink family (Caryophyllaceae) member nuttall's sandwort (Minuartia nuttallii)) is a ground hugging mat with short, needle like leaves.

Rosy sedum (Rhodiola integrifolia), in the stonecrop family (Crassulaceae), has fleshy, moisture retaining leaves. Its stems grow in such profusion that it appears to be a shrub, but it is not since it is not woody.

The legume family (Fabaceae) includes balloon milkvetch (Astragalus whitneyi), a spreading or erect perennial with papery balloon like seedpods, filled with air. The mat forming perennial or subshrub, Brewer's lupine (Lupinus breweri), is well adapted to the alpine zone, low growing, with hairy silver leaves that reflect the intense alpine sunlight and trap air to reduce the drying effects of constant winds. Alpine lupine, or dwarf lupine (Lupinus lepidus), has several semi-prostrate stems. King's clover (Trifolium kingii) grows on open slopes.

Fireweed (Chamerion angustifolium), in the evening primrose family (Onagraceae), is named for its flaming color. Rock fringe (E. obcordatum) grows on dry slopes, nestles in crevices and peaks out from behind the rocks, and forms mats that sprawl across flats and edges of boulders, forming an apparent bright fringe on the edge of moist rocky ledges.

Ladies Tresses (Spiranthes romanzoffiana)is a sweetly fragrant orchid family (Orchidaceae) member with a spiral of flowers.

Davidson's penstemon, or creeping penstemon (Penstemon davidsonii), is a perennial spreading mat, with several spreading flower stems. The tubular blossoms are longer than the stems of the dwarfed plant that supports them. John Muir's favorite wildflower, mountain pride (Penstemon newberryi), "carpets granite slopes with brilliant pink flowers". Showy penstemon (Penstemon speciosus)) is a spreading perennial. American alpine speedwell (Veronica wormskjoldii) is an erect perennial that grows near moist streambanks and lakeshores from an underground stem (rhizome).

Spreading phlox (Phlox diffusa) is a matted perennial with sprawling stems. "With its dramatic beauty", sky pilot is "thought to be one of the finest and most beautiful Sierra wildflowers". Showy polemonium (Polemonium pulcherrimum) grows in most Sierra Nevada habitats, and has tightly pinnate leaves with leaflets reminiscent in appearance to the armored tail of a stagasaurus dinosaur.

Buckwheat family (Polygonaceae) perennials include lady's thumb (Bistorta bistortoides), a perennial growing from a contorted rhizome (underground stem). Frosted wild buckwheat (E. incanum) is densely covered with white hairs so as to appear "frosted", and grows to  elevation.

It is unusual among alpine plants in that it has leaves that are relatively large, broad, and hairless (and edible, with a tangy-tart taste - "oxyria" meaning "sour").

The primrose family (Primulaceae) has the alpine shooting star (Dodecatheon alpinum), also found at lower elevation zones, and found near stream and lake sides. Also sierra primrose, (Primula suffrutescens ), considered by photographers to be one of the most spectacular alpine flowers, forms large mats around rocks and is covered with rose petals, similar to rock fringe (Epilobium obcordatum). It tends to grow on north facing slopes were there is moisture from melting snow.

Botanist Laird Blackwell describes the growth pattern of its fleshy leaves and colonies as "its basal leaves form amazing patterns on the ground like many-armed starfish reaching for the sky... this is a plant that begs for a long look and close examination regardless of where it happens to be in its blooming cycle."

The buttercup family (Ranunculaceae) has Drummond's anemone (Anemone drummondii), a showy perennial. Unlike lower elevations, which are pollinated by hummingbirds that do not reach alpine elevations, alpine columbine is pollinated by moths, so are upright and totally ultraviolet reflecting white. High mountain larkspur grows among willows and rocks along creeks, also up to  elevation. Buttercups (Ranunculus) are among the earliest blooming of the alpine zone. Alpine buttercup is conspicuous with its bright lemon yellow flowers, which contrast with their rock environment.

It has intricate  leaves growing from a basal rosette, which are pinnately divided into 10-20 pairs of opposite, tiny lobed leaflets, creating the appearance of a nest of green centipedes. 
Club-moss (Ivesia lycopodioides) is not a moss, but a low growing perennial, with erect, but sprawling stems, growing in the crevices of rock ledges and in wet meadows. Mousetail (I. shockleyi) is a tiny herbaceous perennial.

Perennial grasslike plants
Perennial grasslike plants (graminoids) constitute 21% of the Sierra Nevada alpine species.

A characteristic grass family (Poaceae) is squirreltail (Elymus elymoides).

A characteristic sedge family member is alpine sedge (Carex subnigricans).

Shrubs

Shrubs tend to be small, and low growing to cope with high wind conditions and dense snowcovering, forming mats and cushions. Woody shrubs together with annuals constitute only about 6% of the number of Sierra Nevada alpine floral species.

Dwarf bilberry, or sierra bilberry (Vaccinium caespitosum), is a tufted, low growing woody plant that make a red and gold carpet around alpine lakes in the fall.

Sierra primrose (Primula suffrutescens) is in the primrose family (Primulaceae), and is a sprawling, low growing subshrub found under overhanging rocks, and reaching only .

The mat forming Rocky Mountain willow (Salix petrophila), in the willow family (Salicaceae), grows to only . Arctic willow (Salix arctica) is  tiny, creeping, prostrate, and mat forming. Snow willow (Salix reticulata) occurs in alpine cirques in Mono County, CA.

Ferns, bryophytes, lichens, fungi, and interacting animals
The macrolichen flora in the Sierra Nevada alpine zone of Mount Dana, Mammoth Peak, and the ridge above Parker Pass, is not well developed compared to neighboring alpine zones in the Rocky Mountains and mountains of the Pacific Northwest.

See also
 Alpine plant
 Alpine tundra
 Montane ecology
 Sierra Nevada
 Sierra Nevada subalpine zone

References

Alpine zone
Lists of flora of California
Sierra Nevada alpine zone
Sierra Nevada (United States)-related lists
Sierra Nevada